Contrarian investing is an investment strategy that is characterized by purchasing and selling in contrast to the prevailing sentiment of the time.

A contrarian believes that certain crowd behavior among investors can lead to exploitable mispricings in securities markets. For example, widespread pessimism about a stock can drive a price so low that it overstates the company's risks, and understates its prospects for returning to profitability. Identifying and purchasing such distressed stocks, and selling them after the company recovers, can lead to above-average gains. Conversely, widespread optimism can result in unjustifiably high valuations that will eventually lead to drops, when those high expectations do not pan out. Avoiding (or short-selling) investments in over-hyped investments reduces the risk of such drops. These general principles can apply whether the investment in question is an individual stock, an industry sector, or an entire market or any other asset class.

Some contrarians have a permanent bear market view, while the majority of investors bet on the market going up.  However, a contrarian does not necessarily have a negative view of the overall stock market, nor do they have to believe that it is always overvalued, or that the conventional wisdom is always wrong. Rather, a contrarian seeks opportunities to buy or sell specific investments when the majority of investors appear to be doing the opposite, to the point where that investment has become mispriced. While more "buy" candidates are likely to be identified during market declines (and vice versa), these opportunities can occur during periods when the overall market is generally rising or falling.

Similarity to value investing
Contrarian investing is related to value investing in that the contrarian is also looking for mispriced investments and buying those that appear to be undervalued by the market. In "The Art of Contrary Thinking" (1954) by Humphrey B. Neill; considered influential by some in contrarian thinking, he notes it is easy to find something to go contrary to, but difficult to discover when everybody believes it.  He concludes "when everybody thinks alike, everybody is likely to be wrong." Some well-known value investors such as John Neff have questioned whether there is a such thing as a "contrarian", seeing it as essentially synonymous with value investing. One possible distinction is that a value stock, in finance theory, can be identified by financial metrics such as the book value or P/E ratio. A contrarian investor may look at those metrics, but is also interested in measures of "sentiment" regarding the stock among other investors, such as sell-side analyst coverage and earnings forecasts, trading volume, and media commentary about the company and its business prospects.

In the example of a stock that has dropped because of excessive pessimism, one can see similarities to the "margin of safety" that value investor Benjamin Graham sought when purchasing stocks—essentially, being able to buy shares at a discount to their intrinsic value. Arguably, that margin of safety is more likely to exist when a stock has fallen a great deal, and that type of drop is usually accompanied by negative news and general pessimism.

Along with this, although more dangerous, is shorting overvalued stocks. This requires 'deep pockets' in that an overvalued security may continue to rise, due to over-optimism, for quite some time. Eventually, the short-seller believes, the stock will 'crash and burn'.

Notable contrarian investors
Bill Ackman is a contrarian investor who twice reinvested heavily in beaten-down Valeant Pharmaceuticals against prevailing market sentiments. Later, he short-sold Herbalife, but was forced to take a large loss after the stock failed to fall as predicted.
Warren Buffett is a famous contrarian, who believes the best time to invest in a stock is when shortsightedness of the market has beaten down the price.
Keith Gill is a contrarian/value investor who produces educational YouTube videos, publicizing his bullish position in a company (GameStop) that most saw to be on its deathbed. His gains in that one stock surpassed 10,000% in under 1 year, maxing out at 44 million dollars before the stock dropped dramatically. He has since doubled his position in anticipation of more growth, and has seen more than 500% additional growth since doubling down.
Ryan Cohen is a notable contrarian/value investor. He was able to best Amazon, against public opinion, at online pet product sales and delivery through the company "Chewy." Cohen was able to sell Chewy for $3.35 billion. He has since taken a large enough stake in a company called GameStop to have more shares than any other individual. He has taken an aggressive activist value investor position in the company, and is up for the chairman of the board position. He has hired seasoned e-commerce specialists from executive positions in both Chewy and Amazon to take on leadership roles in GameStop moving forward. 
Dodge & Cox is an American investing firm whose approach has been characterized as contrarian.
Michael Lee-Chin is a Jamaican billionaire investor who is often associated with contrarian investing. 
Jim Rogers is an investor and author who is bullish on contrarian investing in Asian markets.
Marc Faber is a contrarian investor who publishes the Gloom Boom & Doom Report.
David Dreman is a money manager often associated with contrarian investing. He has authored several books on the topic and writes the "Contrarian" column in Forbes magazine. 
John Maynard Keynes was an early contrarian investor. 
John Neff, who managed the Vanguard Windsor fund for many years, is also considered a contrarian, though he has described himself as a value investor (and questioned the distinction).
Mark Ripple is a money manager often described as a contrarian. He has authored a book covering the topic in detail.
Paul Tudor Jones is a contrarian investor who attempts to buy and sell turning points.
Howard Marks regularly focuses his client memos on contrarian investing.
 Humphrey B. Neill has been described as the father of contrary investing; see his book cited above.
Allan Gray was a noted South African contrarian investor that believed the best value was typically to be had when the market was down.
George Soros is often described as a visionary contrarian investor by analysts who cite his famous shorting of the yen and pound, an act that netted him $2 billion in profits.

Examples of contrarian investing
Economist John Maynard Keynes was an early contrarian investor when he managed the endowment for King's College, Cambridge from the 1920s to '40s. While most university endowments of the time invested almost exclusively in land and fixed income assets, Keynes was perhaps the first institutional investor to invest heavily in common stocks and international stocks. On average, Keynes's investments out-performed the U.K. market by more than 6% with a strategy similar to, but developed independently of, the value investing paradigm of Benjamin Graham and Charles Dodd.

Commonly used contrarian indicators for investor sentiment are Volatility Indexes (informally also referred to as "Fear indexes"), like VIX, which by tracking the prices of financial options, gives a numeric measure of how pessimistic or optimistic market actors at large are. A low number in this index indicates a prevailing optimistic or confident investor outlook for the future, while a high number indicates a pessimistic outlook. By comparing the VIX to the major stock-indexes over longer periods of time, it is evident that peaks in this index generally present good buying opportunities.

Another example of a simple contrarian strategy is Dogs of the Dow. When purchasing the stocks in the Dow Jones Industrial Average that have the highest relative dividend yield, an investor is often buying many of the "distressed" companies among those 30 stocks. These "Dogs" have high yields not because dividends were raised, but rather because their share prices fell. The company is experiencing difficulties, or simply is at a low point in their business cycle. By repeatedly buying such stocks, and selling them when they no longer meet the criteria, the "Dogs" investor is systematically buying the least-loved of the Dow 30, and selling them when they become loved again eventually.

When the Dot com bubble started to deflate, an investor would have profited by avoiding the technology stocks that were the subject of most investors' attention. Asset classes such as value stocks and real estate investment trusts were largely ignored by the financial press at the time, despite their historically low valuations, and many mutual funds in those categories lost assets. These investments experienced strong gains amidst the large drops in the overall US stock market when the bubble unwound.

The Fidelity Contrafund was founded in 1967 "to take a contrarian view, investing in out-of-favor stocks or sectors", but over time has abandoned this strategy to become a large cap growth fund.

Relationship to behavioral finance
Contrarians are attempting to exploit some of the principles of behavioral finance, and there is significant overlap between these fields. For example, studies in behavioral finance have demonstrated that investors as a group tend to overweight recent trends when predicting the future; a poorly performing stock will remain bad, and a strong performer will remain strong. This lends credence to the contrarian's belief that investments may drop "too low" during periods of negative news, due to incorrect assumptions by other investors, regarding the long-term prospects for the company. Furthermore, Foye and Mramor (2016) find that country-specific factors have a strong influence on measures of value (such as the book-to-market ratio). This leads them to conclude that the reasons why value stocks outperform are both country-specific and behavioral.

See also
 Swing trading 
 Bollinger Bands
 Dow Jones Indexes
 Value investing

References

External links

How to Use Patterns in Contrarian FX Trading
Warren Buffett's Berkshire Hathaway Shareholder Letters

Investment
Crowds